Jarvis Parkinson (born 20 August 1998) is an English swimmer. He won a silver in individual medley as a junior at the European Games. In his first senior international appearance at the 2018 Commonwealth Games, he won two silver medals in freestyle relays.

Early life
Parkinson is from Hatfield Woodhouse in Doncaster, South Yorkshire. He was a student at Trinity Academy in Thorne. He was given swimming lesson while young, and when he was eight, he started to swim competitively for Armthorpe Kingfishers. He was a member of Doncaster Dartes Swimming Club before he moved to train at Loughborough National Centre.

Career
In 2015, when he was 16, he took part in the inaugural European Games in Baku, Azerbaijan, and won a silver in the 200m individual medley.
In 2017, at the British Championships in Sheffield, he broke the English record for his age group in 200m individual medley, winning the event at under 2 minutes.

Parkinson made his first senior appearance in an international competition at the 2018 Commonwealth Games held at the Gold Coast, Australia. He first won a silver as part of the relay team that won silver in the 4x100m freestyle event. He won a second silver in the 4x200m freestyle.

References

External links

English male swimmers
English male freestyle swimmers
Male medley swimmers
Sportspeople from Doncaster
1998 births
Living people
People educated at Thorne Grammar School
Swimmers at the 2015 European Games
Commonwealth Games medallists in swimming
Commonwealth Games silver medallists for England
Swimmers at the 2018 Commonwealth Games
European Games medalists in swimming
European Games silver medalists for Great Britain
21st-century English people
Medallists at the 2018 Commonwealth Games